The Cookcamp is a novel by Gary Paulsen. The story is about a boy  who is sent to the north to live with his grandmother because of his parents being occupied with World War II. It was published on March 1, 1991 by Scholastic.

In 1999 it was followed by the sequel Alida's Song.

Novels by Gary Paulsen
1991 American novels
Novels set during World War II